Windsor Stadium is a 3,000-capacity stadium located in Windsor, Ontario, Canada, the stadium is mainly used for Canadian Football and soccer, but has hosted rugby and other sports. It was home to the Ontario Football Conference team the Windsor AKO Fratmen prior to their acquisition in 2020 by St. Clair College, and Canadian Soccer League team the Windsor Stars before they became Windsor TFC. Windsor Stadium is located within Jackson Park.

The Windsor AKO Fratmen Football Team is a Canadian Football team that played in the Canadian Junior Football League since the 1940s and won national titles in 1952, 1954, and 1999. The Fratmen have played at Fratmen Field at Windsor Stadium since 1953. The 2007 CSL All-star game was held at Windsor Stadium.

Sources

Sports venues in Windsor, Ontario
Soccer venues in Ontario
Canadian football venues in Ontario
Multi-purpose stadiums in Canada